Helderberg Reformed Dutch Church was a historic Dutch Reformed church at 140 Main Street in Guilderland, Albany County, New York.  It was built in 1895 in a vernacular Late Gothic Revival style.  The church burned and was demolished in 1986. The Reformed congregation which occupied the church was chartered in 1767. They erected a new church building in Guilderland Center in 1987. The original cornerstone of the historic church was laid into the edifice of this new church building.

Helderberg Reformed Dutch Church was listed on the National Register of Historic Places in 1982.

References

Buildings and structures demolished in 1986
Reformed Church in America churches in New York (state)
Churches on the National Register of Historic Places in New York (state)
Gothic Revival church buildings in New York (state)
Churches completed in 1895
19th-century Reformed Church in America church buildings
Churches in Albany County, New York
Former Dutch Reformed churches in New York (state)
National Register of Historic Places in Albany County, New York
1895 establishments in New York (state)
1986 disestablishments in New York (state)